Sioux Falls Thunder FC is a men's soccer club based in Sioux Falls, South Dakota. The club currently competes in the National Premier Soccer League in the North Conference, having joined the league as an expansion team in 2016. The team's colors are red and black.

History

Timeline
The club was founded by Amadu Meyers in 2016, coinciding with the announcement that it  would be joining NPSL as an expansion team for the 2017 season. The club played their inaugural match on May 13, 2017 at Yankton Trail Park in Sioux Falls against the Dakota Fusion FC. The first goal scored in team history came in the 6th minute when Houston Hoffman connected on a penalty kick. The Thunder would end up losing the match 3-1. The Thunder got their first win on May 30, 2017 against LC Aris FC by a score of 3-0. On March 1, 2018 the club announced that Mekonnen Afa would become the third head coach in franchise history. The Thunder would start the 2018 season strong by taking 4 points in the first 2 games. But after that they would struggle and lose 9 straight games. The Thunder would finally get on the winning side of things by winning 5-2 against Dakota Fusion FC. They would carry that momentum and they would eventually win their next two games to finish the season with a total of 4 wins. After the regular season concluded Nigel Nielsen, Thunder midfielder, was named to the North Conference XI team.

Season-by-Season Record

All-Time Top Goalscorers

Bold Signifies a Current Thunder Player

Team

Current roster

Staff

References

External links

Association football clubs established in 2016
National Premier Soccer League teams
2016 establishments in South Dakota
Soccer in South Dakota
Sports in Sioux Falls, South Dakota